Hillary Janssens (born July 21, 1994 in Surrey, British Columbia) is a Canadian rower from Surrey, British Columbia.

Hillary and her rowing partner Caileigh Filmer won a gold medal at the 2018 World Rowing Championships in Bulgaria and a bronze medal at the 2019 World Rowing Championships.

Hillary began her rowing career at the University of British Columbia in Vancouver in 2012. Achieving immediate success in the sport, Hillary joined the National Team in 2014. In 2016, she graduated from UBC with a Bachelor of Science degree in Biology. In her five years rowing for UBC, she was undefeated in the coxless pairs and set numerous school records for indoor rowing. Hillary currently resides in Victoria, British Columbia.

She represented Canada at the 2020 Summer Olympics.

She is the niece of NHL player, Mark Janssens.

References

External links

1994 births
Living people
Canadian female rowers
World Rowing Championships medalists for Canada
Rowers at the 2020 Summer Olympics
Medalists at the 2020 Summer Olympics
Olympic medalists in rowing
Olympic bronze medalists for Canada
Sportspeople from Surrey, British Columbia
21st-century Canadian women